Selahattin Taşdöğen (born 19 July 1951) is a Turkish actor.

In 1986, he graduated from Marmara University School of Fine Arts. Since the beginning of his career, he has appeared in various plays, movies and TV series. He began his career on stage in 1969 by joining Keloğlan Children's Theatre. He then worked for Türkbank Children's Theatre. In 1974, Taşdöğen started his career in cinema and television.

Selahattin Taşdöğen also works as a teacher. He has been teaching art, art history and tourism in various schools. Theatres where he has worked or contributed to include Bakırköy Comedy Theatre, Istanbul Theatre, Ercan Yazgan Theatre, Kenan Büke Theatre, Istanbul Municipality City Theatres, Levent Kırca-Oya Başar Theatre, and Yasemin Yalçın Theatre.

Personal life 
His brothers Erkan Taşdöğen and Naci Taşdöğen are also actors.

In 2010, he married actress Nevin Yılmaz in Üsküdar, Istanbul. Taşdöğen has been married three times, including twice with his second wife.

Filmography

References

External links 
 

1951 births
Turkish male television actors
Turkish male film actors
Turkish male stage actors
Living people
Marmara University alumni